Ironing is a sheet metal forming process that uniformly thins the workpiece in a specific area. 

This is a very useful process when employed in combination with deep drawing to produce a uniform wall thickness part with greater height-to-diameter ratio. One example of ironing can be found in the manufacture of aluminum beverage cans, which are actually pressed from flat sheets of thicker material.

Metal forming

blue golly rancher